Xylobiops is a genus of horned powder-post beetles in the family Bostrichidae. There are about six described species in Xylobiops.

Species
These six species belong to the genus Xylobiops:
 Xylobiops basilaris (Say, 1824) (red-shouldered bostrichid)
 Xylobiops concisus Lesne, 1901
 Xylobiops lacustre Wickham, 1912
 Xylobiops parilis Lesne, 1901
 Xylobiops sextuberculatus (LeConte, 1858)
 Xylobiops texanus (Horn, 1878)

References

Further reading

External links

 

Bostrichidae
Articles created by Qbugbot